Meraf Bahta Ogbagaber (born 24 June 1989) is an Eritrean middle-distance runner. She represents Sweden in international competitions and specializes in the 1500 metres and 3000 metres.

Biography
She was born in Dekishahay, Eritrea (at the time still part of Ethiopia). As a junior, she competed in the junior races at the IAAF World Cross Country Championships, finishing twelfth in 2006 and sixth in 2007. Together with her teammates she won the silver medal in the team event at the 2007 championships. She finished fifth in the 1500 metres at the 2006 World Junior Championships. At the 2007 All-Africa Games she finished seventh in the 5000 metres. She competed in her first senior cross-country race at the 2008 World Cross Country Championships, but only finished 43rd.

Her personal best times are 4:05.11 minutes in the 1500 metres, achieved in July 2013 in Heusden-Zolder; and 14:59.49 minutes in the 5000 metres, achieved in July 2014 in Palo Alto, USA. The 5000 personal best also marked a Swedish record (former was from 1995  held by Sara Wedlund). With the sub-15 race Meraf made her big international breakthrough and immediately became one of the best long distance runners on European soil and a medal contender for future European Championships.

She moved from Eritrea to Sweden in 2008. In Sweden she has continued her running career, getting support from Ulf Friberg, the trainer of Mustafa Mohamed. Bahta got her permanent residency permit in 2012 and has applied for Swedish citizenship. In December she got her citizenship and since 2014 she has been eligible to compete for Sweden in international championships. She represented Sweden at the 2016 Summer Olympics finishing 6th in the 1500 m.

In 2014, she also won Tjejmilen.

She finished 9th in the 1500m at the 2017 World Athletics Championships.

Doping suspension 

On 26 July 2018, Swedish newspaper Aftonbladet reported that she was suspected of doping violations.
On 24 June 2019, it was announced that she had been suspended for doping. The suspension period is partly retroactive, lasting from 1 September 2018 to 1 September 2019.

Achievements

Personal bests

Outdoor
 1500 metres – 4:00.49 (Brussels; 1 September 2017)
 Mile – 4:25.26 (Oslo; 9 June 2016)
 3000 metres – 8:37.50 (Doha; 21 July 2016) NR
 5000 metres – 14:49.95 (Rabat; 22 May 2016) NR
 10,000 metres – 31:13.06 (Palo Alto; 5 May 2017) NR

Indoor
 1500 metres – 4:04.89 (Toruń; 15 February 2018)
 3000 metres – 8:42.46 (Madrid; 8 February 2018) NR

References

1989 births
Living people
Eritrean female long-distance runners
Swedish female long-distance runners
Eritrean female middle-distance runners
Swedish female middle-distance runners
European Athletics Championships medalists
Athletes (track and field) at the 2016 Summer Olympics
Olympic athletes of Sweden
Swedish people of Eritrean descent
Swedish sportspeople of African descent
Swedish Athletics Championships winners
World Athletics Championships athletes for Sweden
Athletes (track and field) at the 2007 All-Africa Games
African Games competitors for Eritrea
Athletes (track and field) at the 2020 Summer Olympics
European Athletics Championships winners
Doping cases in athletics